Erysimum gomez-campoi (also spelt Erysimum gomezcampoi) is a short-lived biennial or perennial plant native to southern Spain. It has been treated as one of a complex of six species making up the nevadense group, or as Erysimum nevadense subsp. gomez-campoi.

Taxonomy
Erysimum gomez-campoi was one of a number of new Erysimum species first described by Adolf Polatschek in 1979. Six of these, including E. gomez-campoi, were considered to be closely related and were reduced to subspecies of E. nevadense in Flora Europaea, a decision explained by Peter William  Ball in 1990. The six were treated as separate species making up the E. nevadense group or complex in Flora Iberica in 1993. A molecular phylogenetic study published in 2014 included four of the species, including E. gomez-campoi. The study did not support the view that the four were closely related, and authors concluded that the E. nevadense group did not have phylogenetic support.

References

gomez-campoi
Endemic flora of Spain
Plants described in 1979